Zofia Celińska (July 8, 1919—July 28, 2016) was a Polish economist. She was a member of the Home Army during World War II, and worked as an economist after the war. For her assistance in hiding Jewish friends and their family members during the occupation of Poland, she was recognized as Righteous Among the Nations and received the Commander's Cross of the Order of Polonia Restituta.

Life and career
Celińska was born on July 8, 1919, in Warsaw.

During World War II, she was active in the Home Army. At the age of 20, she distributed the underground pamphlet Biuletyn Informacyjny. During the occupation of Poland, she assisted in hiding her Jewish friend Zofia Lewinówna (pl) and some of Lewinówna's family members for a year in her house. She also helped her friend Ola Zweibaum to enable some of her family members to escape from the Warsaw Ghetto.

After the war, Celińska attended the SGH Warsaw School of Economics, and graduated with a degree in economics. She worked as an economist in the Biuro Projektów i Studia Budownictwa Specjalnej.

Celińska was named Righteous Among the Nations in 2001. In 2009, she was awarded the Commander's Cross of the Order of Polonia Restituta.

Celińska died on July 28, 2016, in Wyszogród.

References

1919 births
2016 deaths
Polish Righteous Among the Nations
20th-century Polish economists
Women economists
People from Warsaw
SGH Warsaw School of Economics alumni